William Hadlow (1861 – 1931) was a British philatelic auctioneer who was appointed to the Roll of Distinguished Philatelists in 1930.

References

British philatelists
1861 births
1931 deaths
Signatories to the Roll of Distinguished Philatelists